Karl-Richard Idlane was an Estonian professional footballer who played as a midfielder for the Estonian national football team.

References

1910 births
1942 deaths
People from Saaremaa Parish
People from Kreis Ösel
Estonian footballers
Association football midfielders
Estonia international footballers
Soviet military personnel of World War II